Jesus H. Christ, also known as SoCal Christ, is an online actor and vlogger, primarily active on YouTube and Fiverr.

Early life
Jesus grew up in Bakersfield, California in a deeply religious Mormon family. He received his patriarchal blessing at the age of 15, which prophesied that he would help the church through the use of computers. He performed his mission in Argentina between the ages of 19 and 21. He then got married and started working as a wedding DJ and videographer.

Starting in 2008, Jesus began questioning his faith, particularly due to use of the Internet. In September 2011, a ceremony with his newborn daughter and a conversation with his older brother led to further skepticism, and he was thrown out by his wife after sharing his thoughts with her. They divorced at some time thereafter.

Jesus moved to Long Beach and began exploring secular topics on YouTube, where he was inspired by Joe Rogan.

Career
Jesus debuted on Fiverr in May 2015, where he performed impressions of his namesake religious figure while reading a custom script.

In January 2017, famous YouTuber PewDiePie hired him for a short performance, coinciding with his antisemitism controversy. Jesus was banned from Fiverr shortly afterwards, but successfully pleaded to get unbanned. The following years, he greatly benefited from the exposure which PewDiePie's videos had given him.

Starting in November 2018, Jesus became involved in a child custody battle with his ex-wife. On January 6, 2019, he published an out-of-character YouTube video where he explained some of his life's past and his current legal battle, and asked for financial help for a custody evaluation. The money he asked for was successfully raised through Patreon during the following days. Simultaneously, Jesus was also accused of sexual misconduct by YouTuber , which he denied.

Personal life
Jesus claims that "Jesus H. Christ" is his full legal name following a name change. He owns a dog named Judas.

See also
VoiceoverPete

References

External links
Official website
YouTube
Twitter

1980s births
20th-century American male actors
21st-century American male actors
American YouTubers
Cultural depictions of Jesus
Former Latter Day Saints
Living people
Year of birth uncertain
YouTube channels launched in 2015